In mathematics, a cofinite subset of a set  is a subset  whose complement in  is a finite set. In other words,  contains all but finitely many elements of  If the complement is not finite, but is countable, then one says the set is cocountable.

These arise naturally when generalizing structures on finite sets to infinite sets, particularly on infinite products, as in the product topology or direct sum. 

This use of the prefix "" to describe a property possessed by a set's mplement is consistent with its use in other terms such as "meagre set".

Boolean algebras

The set of all subsets of  that are either finite or cofinite forms a Boolean algebra, which means that it is closed under the operations of union, intersection, and complementation.

Cofinite topology

As a consequence, in the cofinite topology, the only closed subsets are finite sets, or the whole of  Symbolically, one writes the topology as

This topology occurs naturally in the context of the Zariski topology.

Properties

 Subspaces: Every subspace topology of the cofinite topology is also a cofinite topology.
 Compactness: Since every open set contains all but finitely many points of  the space  is compact and sequentially compact.
 Separation:  The cofinite topology is the coarsest topology satisfying the T1 axiom; that is, it is the smallest topology for which every singleton set is closed. In fact, an arbitrary topology on  satisfies the T1 axiom if and only if it contains the cofinite topology. If  is finite then the cofinite topology is simply the discrete topology. If  is not finite then this topology is not Hausdorff (T2), regular or normal because no two nonempty open sets are disjoint (that is, it is hyperconnected).

Double-pointed cofinite topology

The double-pointed cofinite topology is the cofinite topology with every point doubled; that is, it is the topological product of the cofinite topology with the indiscrete topology on a two-element set.  It is not T0 or T1, since the points of each doublet are topologically indistinguishable.  It is, however, R0 since topologically distinguishable points are separated.  The space is compact as the product of two compact spaces; alternatively, it is compact because each nonempty open set contains all but finitely many points.

For an example of the countable double-pointed cofinite topology, the set  of integers can be given a topology such that every even number  is topologically indistinguishable from the following odd number .  The closed sets are the unions of finitely many pairs  or the whole set.  The open sets are the complements of the closed sets; namely, each open set consists of all but a finite number of pairs  or is the empty set.

Other examples

Product topology
The product topology on a product of topological spaces  has basis  where  is open, and cofinitely many 

The analog without requiring that cofinitely many factors are the whole space is the box topology.

Direct sum
The elements of the direct sum of modules  are sequences  where cofinitely many 

The analog without requiring that cofinitely many summands are zero is the direct product.

See also

References

  (See example 18)

Basic concepts in infinite set theory
General topology